Patrick Brennan (18 February 1922 – 10 June 1998) was an Irish Fianna Fáil politician who sat for 25 years as a Teachta Dála (TD) for the Wicklow constituency, and was briefly a Senator.

Brennan first stood for election to Dáil Éireann as a Clann na Poblachta candidate in Kildare in the 1948 Irish general election. He fared poorly, coming second last with only 3.0% of the vote, compared to 10.7% secured by his Clann na Poblachta running mate Daniel Boland. 

He ran against next as a Fianna Fáil candidate in Wicklow in the 1953 by-election caused by the death of his father Thomas Brennan, a Fianna Fáil TD for Wicklow from 1944 to 1954. While unsuccessful, he was returned at the following 1954 general election, where he was elected to the 15th Dáil, and was returned at the next four general elections. He topped the poll on each occasion, and by virtue of one of the largest votes at the 1957 general election, he managed to secure two seats for Fianna Fáil in the constituency, where he was joined by his running mate James O'Toole.

On 21 April 1965 he was appointed as Parliamentary Secretary to the Minister for Local Government by the government of Seán Lemass. He was appointed to the same position on 16 November 1966 and on 9 July 1969 by the governments of Jack Lynch. He resigned on 8 May 1970, just two days after the resignation of the Minister for Local Government, Kevin Boland, and the sacking of Neil Blaney and Charles Haughey as ministers at the outbreak of the Arms Crisis.

Brennan abstained in a vote of confidence in Jim Gibbons on 10 November 1971 and was expelled from the Fianna Fáil parliamentary party on 17 November 1971. While closely aligned with Kevin Boland, Brennan did not join Boland's new party, Aontacht Éireann. He contested the 1973 general election as an Independent candidate, but he lost his seat to Fianna Fáil's Ciarán Murphy.

He subsequently rejoined Fianna Fáil, and at the 1981 general election he was elected again as TD for Wicklow. He lost his seat at the February 1982 election, and was a Taoiseach's nominee to the Seanad but was re-elected to the Dáil at the November 1982 general election, ousting Ciarán Murphy. Brennan retired from politics at the 1987 general election.

See also
Families in the Oireachtas

References

1922 births
1998 deaths
Clann na Poblachta politicians
Fianna Fáil TDs
Fianna Fáil senators
Members of the 15th Dáil
Members of the 16th Dáil
Members of the 16th Seanad
Members of the 17th Dáil
Members of the 18th Dáil
Members of the 19th Dáil
Members of the 22nd Dáil
Members of the 24th Dáil
Nominated members of Seanad Éireann
Parliamentary Secretaries of the 18th Dáil
Parliamentary Secretaries of the 19th Dáil